The high commissioner of the United Kingdom to Canada is the United Kingdom's foremost diplomatic representative in Canada and is in charge of the  British diplomatic mission to Canada.

As fellow members of the Commonwealth of Nations, diplomatic relations between the United Kingdom and Canada are at governmental level, rather than between heads of state, sharing the same King.  Thus, the countries exchange High Commissioners, rather than ambassadors.

The offices of the British High Commission are at 80 Elgin Street in Ottawa, which was built in 1964 on the site of the old Grand Union Hotel.

The British High Commissioner's residence is Earnscliffe in Ottawa on Sussex Drive. The house was built in 1855, was later occupied by Canada's first prime minister, John A. Macdonald, and was bought in 1930 by the first British High Commissioner to Canada, Sir William Clark.

The incumbent high commissioner is Susannah Goshko, who assumed the office in September 2021.

List of heads of mission

High Commissioners to Canada 

 1928–1934: Sir William Clark
 1934–1938: Sir Francis Floud
 1938–1941: Sir Gerald Campbell
 1941–1946: Malcolm MacDonald
 1946–1952: Sir Alexander Clutterbuck
 1952–1956: Sir Archibald Nye
 1956–1961: Sir Saville Garner
 1961–1963: The Viscount Amory
 1963–1968: Sir Henry Lintott
 1968–1970: Sir Colin Crowe
 1970–1974: Sir Peter Hayman
 1974–1978: Sir John Johnston
 1978–1981: Sir John Ford
 1981–1984: The Lord Moran
 1984–1987: Sir Derek Day
 1987–1989: Sir Alan Urwick
 1989–1992: Sir Brian Fall
 1992–1996: Sir Nicholas Bayne
 1996–2000: Sir Anthony Goodenough
 2000–2003: Sir Andrew Burns
 2003–2006: David Reddaway
 2006–2011: Anthony Cary
 2011–2012: Andrew Pocock
 2012–2013: Corin Robertson (acting)
 2013–2017: Howard Drake
 2017–2021: Susan le Jeune d'Allegeershecque

–present:  Susannah Goshko

See also

 British High Commission, Ottawa
 Canada–United Kingdom relations

References

External links 

British High Commission Ottawa

 
Canada
United Kingdom
Canada and the Commonwealth of Nations
United Kingdom and the Commonwealth of Nations